Pedro Andrade  (born April 14, 1979) is a Brazilian journalist and model.

Career

He began his acting career at the age of seven in Brazil. A student of journalism, Andrade originally came to the United States on a Poetry scholarship.

Andrade was discovered by fashion photographer Mario Testino and traveled the world modeling for clients like Giorgio Armani before joining LXTV (NBC's lifestyle network) in 2006, hosting television in New York Taxis.  Besides hosting LXTV 1st Look TV, he has a show on LXTV.com called On The Rocks: The Search for America's Top Bartender.
Andrade also runs a website about fashion, food, art, nightlife and entertainment.
He was also a reporter for Manhattan Connection, a Brazilian TV show at Globo News, Globo TV Cable News Network. On Brazilian radio he presents a weekly show, Conexão América (America Connection) at Eldorado FM Station. In 1999, Andrade appeared in LG Electronics TV Commercials.

Through volunteer work, donations and special appearances, Andrade supports a number of humanitarian causes such as Cancer Researchers , AIDS Research, Environmental Preservation, as well as a number of children's charities such as the Make a Wish Foundation and Big Brother. In 2007, he and his dog, Miles, appeared alongside Oprah Winfrey, Gisele Bündchen and Kelly Ripa in Pose For Paws, a coffee table book by photographer Brian Nice benefiting the Humane Society.

Controversies

In 2002, while still working as a model and trying to kick-start his acting career, Pedro frequented the pages of the main newspapers and magazines in Brazil claiming to be the protagonist of the next David Lynch film.  However, although it had wide coverage by the São Paulo press, the newspaper “Folha de São Paulo” investigated the information with the production of the filmmaker who categorically denied the information.  Told by the newspaper, the agent informed that the film did not exist.  On the other hand, according to Pedro, the production of the film would be "indignant" with him for having released the film without authorisation: "They won't mind if I come off as a liar".

Personal life
Andrade currently lives in West Village, New York City. He briefly dated Lance Bass, a former member of the band 'N Sync in the summer of 2007.

Filmography

Television

References

External links

Who is Pedro Andrade? New York Post Page Six profile Oct 12, 2008 
Facebook Page
Twitter Page
Video: Hows Pedro Andrade Killing Time
Interview on Full Frontal Fashion
LXTV website
World of Models profile 
Profile on Hunky Male Celebs
Video of Pedro Andrade day from LXTV

1979 births
Living people
Brazilian emigrants to the United States
People from Rio de Janeiro (city)
Brazilian journalists
Male journalists
Brazilian television presenters
Brazilian male models
Brazilian male actors
Brazilian LGBT entertainers
Gay models
Gay entertainers
21st-century Brazilian male actors
Brazilian models
American journalists
Brazilian American
American people of Brazilian descent
Controversies in Brazil
Journalists from New York City